King Henry VIII School is a coeducational private day school located in Coventry, England, comprising a senior school (ages 11–18) and associated preparatory school (ages 3–11). The senior school has approximately 574 pupils (of which 167 are in the Sixth Form). The current senior school fees stand at £13,785 per year, with bursaries and scholarships available. Due to its location close to Coventry railway station, the school accommodates pupils from around the West Midlands area, including towns at 30 miles' distance, such as Northampton, Warwick, Balsall Common, Leamington Spa, Kenilworth, Rugby and Nuneaton.

The school is situated on an  urban site. The buildings are an example of Victorian collegiate architecture. The campus has more recent buildings, including a new art complex, drama studio, sports hall, library and, most recently, a swimming pool and fitness suite. In 2015 an extension was added to the library. The Junior school has its own building on the same site, for pupils in Year 2 to Year 6. Nursery to Year 2 provision is via a shared facility with Bablake School. This is centred at The Grange, located approximately three miles away.

Pupils take part in extra-curricular activities including sports played at county, regional and national levels, music, drama, Duke of Edinburgh's Award scheme, public speaking, chess and a variety of additional academic societies.

The school is run by the Coventry School Foundation, a registered charity, and jointly administered with Bablake School under a common Board of Governors. The schools have mutual arrangements such as a common entrance examination, shared astroturf pitches, and similar school uniforms, differing only in the style of tie and the badge on the blazer. The Coventry School Foundation also includes the new Bablake Junior School and King Henry VIII Junior School, formed from the merger of Coventry Preparatory School with King Henry VIII Junior School from the beginning of the 2008/9 academic year. Until 2021, the two school sites remained in use by the preparatory school, with the Reception to Y2 classes occupying the old Coventry Preparatory site, which is known as Swallows, in honour of the school's founder. In September 2021 the Swallows (Coventry Preparatory School) site was closed to pupils, with provision being combined with Bablake School at The Grange. The Y3 to Y6 classes occupy the King Henry VIII Junior School site, adjacent to the senior school, which is known as Hales in honour of that school's founder. With effect from September 2008, King Henry VIII School began to offer continuity of education from ages 3 to 18.

History

The school was founded on 23 July 1545 by the Clerk of the Hanaper John Hales as the Free Grammar School under letters patent of King Henry VIII.
During the initial foundation of the school it was located in the Whitefriars' Monastery. Nevertheless, due to religious differences, the school was relocated to the building of the former St. John's Hospital in 1558, where it spent more than 300 years before moving to its present site on the south side of the city in 1885, a building there having been designed for it by Edward Burgess. Much of this original redbrick still stands despite Second World War damage, as well as many expansions.

In 1572 the school's administration was conveyed to the Coventry Corporation. In 1573 a deed was legalised by the Mayor of Coventry, according to which endowments were allocated to the school for the school's overall maintenance, but more particularly to fund music as part of the educational curriculum.

In 1601, the School's library was established and maintained by the donations of affluent contributors.

In the 18th century the School experienced decline and struggle.

Due to financial difficulties, the School was required to introduce fees to the students. In an attempt to deal with these struggles the School was divided into two departments: Classical and Commercial. The Commercial subjects were taught at the Schoolroom and were greatest in demand, while the Classical subjects were taught in the library and were specifically aimed at boys willing to attend the University.

In 1878 the School was no longer a "Free Grammar School" and it became an independent institution after being under the administration of the Corporation and the City Authorities for 300 years.  The old school premises were condemned and the new buildings, used at the present, were established on Warwick Road in 1885. Further improvements to the curriculum were also implemented and more subjects were introduced. By 1910 the number of pupils had increased. Over the next several years, the school continued to thrive and in 1926 the Preparatory classes were reinstated. By 1939 the number of boys in the school had grown from 94 in 1901 to approximately 500. The number of pupils continued to grow during the Second World War (1939–1945) with over 822 students in the school, 179 in the Junior division. Regardless of the damage caused by the bombings over Coventry, which diminished the school's library and other buildings, the school continued to expand and develop. Girls were first admitted to the school in 1975.

In October 2020, it was announced that the school would merge with Bablake School, with the combined school is set to open in September 2021. The proposed new school was initially named Coventry School, before backlash from parents and staff led to Bablake and King Henry VIII School being chosen. The plan was abandoned during the course of 2021, with the decision to share some facilities and teaching (particularly in the sixth form) between King Henry VIII School and Bablake School.

In December 2021, at the request of the Department for Education the school was subject to a regulatory compliance inspection, carried out by the Independent Schools Inspectorate. The report following this inspection found that the school did not meet compliance standards in five areas, relating to safeguarding; quality of leadership and management; supervision of pupils; teaching of RSE and PSHE; and the carrying out of required checks on staff employed.  A subsequent monitoring inspection in September 2022, found that the school still did not meet all of the statutory regulations, finding that the standard was not met in three areas, relating to safeguarding; quality of leadership and management; and the carrying out of required checks on staff employed.

In September 2022, the governors appointed Mr. Chris Staley as Principal and CEO for all the schools under their administration. This role is to provide overall responsibility for the strategic leadership, management and development of the Foundation and those schools that fall under its operational umbrella. The heads of each of the schools report to the Principal and CEO.

Le Fousseau
In 1991 Le Logis de Fousseau, a manor house in the French Department of Mayenne, was donated to the Foundation by Mr Bill Boucher for the use and benefit of the pupils of the Foundation. Le Fousseau is around 15 km from Fougères. The border with Brittany is only a few kilometres to the west and that of Normandy some 20 km to the north. The chateau was typically used for residential trips by students practising French.

With effect from September 2012, the school no longer made use of Le Fousseau. The Coventry School Foundation took the decision in 2012 to sell the property.

Publicity
King Henry VIII School's swimming pool was shown in a BMW ad starring Rebecca Adlington.

In 2017 a large scale advertising campaign was launched by the Senior School in the Coventry and West Midlands area in an attempt to attract new, external, enthusiastic students.

Controversies

Debee Ashby, a teenage glamour model was expelled from the school in 1983 after topless Page 3 pictures were published.

Former headmaster, Terence James Vardon, left his position after pleading guilty to three charges of possessing indecent images of children between 1989 and April 1999. In 1999, John Skermer, a senior teacher was also convicted of taking and possessing photographs of naked boys.

A teacher at the school, James Anstice, admitted to a charge of causing criminal damage in 2004 costing £2,500 by destroying a nativity scene at Madame Tussauds featuring David and Victoria Beckham.

In 2012, two pupils were expelled over allegations they sold drugs to other children; three other students were suspended for a term.

In March 2021, local press reported that the school's systems were infiltrated by an "international cyber crime organisation known to the FBI" and reported that "the organisation responsible did post personal data stolen from the school's system online".

Former headmasters

Thomas Sherwyn BA (Oxon)
Leonard Cox BA (Cantab) MA (Oxon), 1572–1599
John Tovey MA (Oxon), 1599–1602
Jeremiah Arnold, MA (Oxon) MA (Cantab), 1602–1611
James Cranford, 1611–1627
Philemon Holland MD (Cantab) MA (Oxon), 1628–1629
Phineas White BA (Cantab), 1629–1651
Samuel Frankland MA (Cantab), 1651–1691
Samuel Carte MA (Oxon), 1691–1700
George Greenway, 1701–1717
Richard Marsden MA (Oxon), 1717–1718
Edward Jackson BA (Cantab), 1718–1758
Thomas Edwards DD (Cantab), 1758–1779
William Brooks MA (Oxon), 1779–1833
Thomas Sheepshanks MA (Cantab), 1834–1857
Henry Temple, 1857–1867
John Grover, 1867–1879
W.W. Sweet-Escott MA (Oxon), 1879–1889
C.R. Gilbert MA (Cantab), 1890–1906
A.D. Perrott MA (Cantab), 1906–1910
John Lupton MA (Cantab), 1910–1931
A.A.C. Burton MA (Oxon), 1931–1950
Herbert Walker BA (London), 1950–1974 worked in postwar Germany engaged under Lord Annan in denazification of German Universities
Roy Cooke MA (Oxon), 1974–1977
Rhidian James BA (Leeds), 1977–1994
Terence Vardon MA (Oxon), 1994–1999
George Fisher MA (Oxon), 2000–2010
Jason Slack BSc (Durham), 2010–2020
Philip Dearden BA MA Ed, 2020-

Alumni

 Debee Ashby, glamour model.
 Terence Brain, Bishop of Salford.
 Richard Baylie, President of St John's College, Oxford.
 Paul Barnes, graphic designer and typographer.
 Ralph Bathurst, Vice-Chancellor of Oxford University.
 Colin Blakemore, author and scientist.
 Nicholas Bullen, musician, composer and writer, co-founder of Napalm Death.
 Joseph Butterworth, English law bookseller.
 Bob Carlton, composer of the rock musical Return to the Forbidden Planet.
 Andrew Copson, Chief Executive of Humanists UK and president of the International Humanist and Ethical Union.
 Edward Thomas Copson, mathematician.
 Jerry Dammers, Musician. Founder Member of The Specials.
 Peter Ho Davies, author.
 Paul Daniel, conductor.
Alison Dougall, academic consultant in special care dentistry.
 Sir William Dugdale, antiquary.
 David Duckham, England international rugby player.
 Omar Ebrahim, baritone vocalist and actor.
 Jackie Fisher, 1st Baron Fisher, admiral in the Royal Navy.
 Sir Frederick Gibberd, architect of Liverpool Metropolitan Cathedral.
 Sir Leslie Gibson, KC, former Chief Justice of Trinidad, Palestine and Hong Kong.
 Andy Goode, rugby player.
 James Grindal, rugby player.
 Roger Harrabin, BBC journalist and reporter.
 Basil Heatley, marathon runner.
 Ian Hobson, pianist.
 Martin Jacques, journalist, writer and TV presenter.
 Philip Larkin, Poet. Has a room, connected to the main school hall, named after him (Philip Larkin room).
 John Wilfrid Linnett, chemist and Vice-Chancellor of Cambridge University.
 Christopher Marshall (doctor), Professor of Cancer Biology, Institute of Cancer Research.
 David McCutchion, Indophile academic.
 Eric Malpass, novelist.
Simon Over, pianist and conductor
 Robert Paterson, Bishop of Sodor and Man.
 Arthur Samuel Peake, theologian and biblical scholar.
 S. S. Prawer, Taylor Professor of German Emeritus, Oxford University.
 Peter Preece, England international rugby player.
 Professor Rebecca Probert, legal historian.
 Peter Robbins, rugby football player
 Peter Rossborough, England international rugby player.
 John Sheepshanks, Bishop of Norwich.
 J. B. Steane, teacher, literary scholar and music critic.
Michael Tooby, curator, Professor of Art & Design, Bath School of Art & Design, Bath Spa University since 2012
 Humphrey Wanley, librarian, palaeographer and scholar of Old English.
 Rear Admiral Anthony Whetstone CB, former Royal Navy officer who served as Flag Officer Sea Training.
 Peter Whittingham, football player (Aston Villa FC, Cardiff City FC and England U21).
 R. E. S. "Bob" Wyatt, England test cricketer.

References

External links

 Official website of King Henry VIII School
 Profile on the ISC website
 Coventry School Foundation
 Review at schoolsguidebook.co.uk

1545 establishments in England
Educational institutions established in the 1540s
Member schools of the Headmasters' and Headmistresses' Conference
Private schools in Coventry